Komsomolsky is a rural locality (a village) in Karanovsky Selsoviet, Miyakinsky District, Bashkortostan, Russia. The population was 177 as of 2010. There are 3 streets.

Geography 
Komsomolsky is located 37 km northeast of Kirgiz-Miyaki (the district's administrative centre) by road. Sergeyevka is the nearest rural locality.

References 

Rural localities in Miyakinsky District